Benedikt Sarnov (January 4, 1927 – April 20, 2014) was a Moscow literary critic, historian of Soviet literature, and writer. After graduating from Maxim Gorky Literature Institute in 1951, he became a member of Union of Soviet Writers in 1960.  He worked in the magazine Literaturnaya Gazeta, created a popular literary radio program and authored a column about Russian prose in Ogonek. In 1990s he became Secretary of the Moscow Writers' Union, a part of Union of Russian Writers. He has published over twenty books, and hundreds of articles and reviews, and continued to be active in the post-Soviet period. His most recent books were about relationships of Stalin and Soviet writers and other intellectuals He died in 2014.

Bibliography
 Наш советский новояз. Маленькая энциклопедия реального социализма. (Our Soviet Newspeak: A Short Encyclopedia of Real Socialism.) (Moscow: 2002) 
 Перестаньте удивляться: непридуманные истории (Moscow: 1998) has been translated into English and was published under the title Stop Being Surprised! Vignettes from Soviet Literary and Other Life by Infinity Publishing in 2004, .

References

Soviet memoirists
1927 births
2014 deaths
Soviet literary historians
Soviet male writers
Russian parodists
Maxim Gorky Literature Institute alumni